Thathanur (East) is a village in the Udayarpalayam taluk of Ariyalur district, Tamil Nadu, India.

Demographics 

As per the 2001 census, Thathanur (East) had a total population of 4029 with 2144 males and 2065 females.

References 

Villages in Ariyalur district